Starship, also known as Lorca and the Outlaws, and 2084, is a 1984 science fiction film directed by Roger Christian from a screenplay by Christian and Matthew Jacobs, and starring John Tarrant, Deep Roy, Donogh Rees, and Cassandra Webb. The music for the film was written by Tony Banks of Genesis.

Plot
On the remote mining planet Ordessa, the management uses killer military police androids to crack down on workers upset with the terrible conditions. Lorca (John Tarrant) and his mother Abbie (Donogh Rees) led the human underground resistance movement until Abbie was killed by androids. Now, Lorca and Suzi (Cassandra Webb) battle Captain Jowitt (Ralph Cotterill) and the brutal bounty hunter Danny (Hugh Keays-Byrne), with the help of the friendly android Grid (Deep Roy).

Cast
John Tarrant as Lorca
Deep Roy as Grid
Donogh Rees as Abbie
Cassandra Webb as Suzi
Ralph Cotterill as Captain Jowitt
Hugh Keays-Byrne as Danny
Joy Smithers as Lena
Tyler Coppin as Detective Droid
James Steele as MP Droid
Arky Michael as Dylan
John Rees as Priest

Production and release
Starship was originally released under the title Lorca and the Outlaws; it also had a working title of The Outlaws and the Starship Redwing. It was filmed in New South Wales and Western Australia in Australia, and at Shepperton Studios in the United Kingdom. Its initial theatrical release was in Australia on 14 December 1984. It later premiered in West Germany on 5 July 1985, and was shown at the Fantasporto Film Festival in Porto, Portugal in February 1987. Its American theatrical release was on 4 April of that year, and the VHS home video was released later that year.

Reception
M.J. Simpson, a British journalist who specialises in reviewing science fiction films, called Lorca and the Outlaws a "sub-sub-Star Wars piece of semi-juvenile rubbish which is nothing more than a scrappily assembled mishmash of clichés and lazy film-making." The Atlanta Journal-Constitution concurred, calling it "a low-rent, Anglo-Australian rip-off" of Star Wars (1977).

Awards and honours
Starship was nominated for an International Fantasy Film Award, in the "Best Film" category, at the Fantasporto film festival in 1987.

Notes

External links

Lorca and the Outlaws at Badmovies.com

1984 films
Films directed by Roger Christian
British science fiction films
Australian science fiction films
1980s science fiction films
1980s English-language films
1980s British films